Philosophy & Technology is a quarterly peer-reviewed academic journal covering philosophy of technology. It is published by Springer Science+Business Media and the editor-in-chief is Luciano Floridi (University of Oxford). Besides regular issues, the journal publishes occasional special issues and topical collections on particular philosophical topics.

Abstracting and indexing
The journal is abstracted and indexed in EBSCO databases, PhilPapers, ProQuest databases, and Scopus.

References

External links

Ethics of science and technology
Philosophy of technology
Philosophy journals
Quarterly journals
English-language journals
Publications established in 1988